The 2016 TCR International Series Singapore round was the ninth round of the 2016 TCR International Series season. It took place on 16–18 September at the Marina Bay Street Circuit.

Jean-Karl Vernay won the first race, starting from pole position driving a Volkswagen Golf GTI TCR and Mikhail Grachev gained the second one, driving a Honda Civic TCR.

Ballast
Due to the results obtained in the previous round, James Nash received +30 kg, Pepe Oriola +20 kg and Stefano Comini +10 kg.

In addition, the Balance of Performance was reviewed for this round: the returning Opel Astra TCR received +30 kg in ballast and the engine power was limited to 95%.

Classification

Qualifying

 — Davit Kajaia, Gianni Morbidelli, Petr Fulín, Kevin Gleason, Jordi Oriola, Rafaël Galiana, Dušan Borković, Neric Wei, Douglas Khoo, Pepe Oriola and Martin Cao all had their fastest laptimes removed for not respecting the track limits.
 — Davit Kajaia, Gianni Morbidelli, Petr Fulín and Martin Cao all received a 6 place grid penalties for not respecting the track limits during qualifying.
 — Kevin Gleason and Jordi Oriola both received a 3 place grid penalties for not respecting the track limits during qualifying.
 — Douglas Khoo and Loris Hezemans were moved to the back of the grid for having not set a time within the 107% limit.

Race 1

Race 2

 — Pepe Oriola was given a drive through penalty for causing an avoidable collision with Gianni Morbidelli.

Standings after the event

Drivers' Championship standings

Model of the Year standings

Teams' Championship standings

 Note: Only the top five positions are included for both sets of drivers' standings.

References

Notes

External links
TCR International Series official website

Singapore
TCR
TCR